Tarz (also Romanized as Ţarz) is a village in Ravar Rural District, in the Central District of Ravar County, Kerman Province, Iran. At the 2006 census, its population was 635, in 176 families.

References 

Populated places in Ravar County